White City, also known as Centerdale, is an unincorporated community in Cullman County, Alabama, United States, located  north of Hanceville. White City was damaged by an EF1 tornado on March 14, 2019, that was produced by the March 2019 North American blizzard.

References

Unincorporated communities in Cullman County, Alabama
Unincorporated communities in Alabama
Ghost towns in the United States
Ghost towns in Alabama